Lachert is a surname. Notable people with the surname include:

Bohdan Lachert (1900–1987), Polish architect
Hanna Lachert (1927–2021), Polish interior architect and furniture designer
Piotr Lachert (1938–2018), Polish composer, pianist and teacher